General elections were held in Malta on 26 and 27 August 1895. For the first time since 1883, every seat was contested.

Background
The elections were held under the Knutsford Constitution. Ten members were elected from single-member constituencies, whilst a further four members were elected to represent nobility and landowners, graduates, clerics and the Chamber of Commerce.

Results
A total of 10,426 people were registered to vote, of which 5,847 cast votes, giving a turnout of 56%.

References

General elections in Malta
Malta
1895 in Malta
Malta